Johns Manville Plaza is a  in Denver, Colorado. It was completed in 1978 and has 29 floors. The building was designed by Hellmuth, Obata and Kassabaum and built by Al Cohen Construction. It is owned by Crescent Real Estate Equities Company, and is the 16th tallest building in Denver. Reflective solar glass windows alternating with  makes up the outer walls. A plaza, basement, and loading dock are shared with 707 17th Street.

See also
List of tallest buildings in Denver

References
Emporis
Skyscraperpage

Skyscraper office buildings in Denver
Office buildings completed in 1978